He Jian (10 April 1887 – 25 April 1956) was a Chinese Nationalist (KMT) general and politician in the Republic of China. He was governor of Hunan province between 1929 and 1937, and Interior Minister from 1937 to 1939. He was best known for fighting the Communists, and he once ordered his subordinates to execute Yang Kaihui (Mao Zedong's wife) and Wu Ruolan (Zhu De's wife).

Names
His courtesy name was Yunqiao and his art name was Rongyuan.

Biography

Education
He Jian was born into a family of farming background in Liling County, Hunan, on April 10, 1887. In 1903 he attended Zhuzici School and then transferred to Liling County Lujiang Middle School. In 1906 he enrolled at Chonggu School and three years later he studied at Hunan Public Law School. After the outbreak of the Xinhai Revolution, he was educated in Wuchang Army High School. After graduating from Baoding Military Academy in 1916 he was assigned to the 1st Brigade of 1st Division of Hunan Ground Force.

Northern Expedition
In March 1918, Chang Ching-yao attacked Hunan, He Jian threw down his arms and fled the field. He returned to his hometown and rebuilt an guerrilla forces. In May, Cheng Qian, the commander-in-chief of Xiang Army, commissioned him as commander of Liuyang-Liling guerrilla forces. In 1919, T'ang Sheng-chih incorporated his army and he became a brigade commander. He joined the Kuomintang and took part in the Northern Expedition. After Wuhan was captured he was promoted to army commander of the 35th Army.

Encirclement and suppression
In April 1927 he fought against Chang Tso-lin's army in Hebei. At the same time, Communist revolutionaries Guo Liang, Liu Zhixun (purged by Xia Xi and executed), and Xia Xi in alliance with Kuomintang leftist pressed ahead with rural land reform in Hunan, this incident lead to intensification of the contradictions between Communist Party and Kuomintang. On May 21, 1927, the Mari Incident broke out, He Jian began to crack down the Communists.

In November 1928, the Nationalist government commissioned him as commander-in-chief of Hunan-Jiangxi Jiaofei Headquarters. His army marched towards the Jinggangshan Revolutionary Base. The Red Army were defeated and fled to the Central Soviet Base Area.

In 1929, he was appointed governor of Hunan province. That same year, his subordinates arrested and then executed Wu Ruolan, wife of Communist military leader Zhu De.

In 1930, the Communist Party sent troops to attack Changsha, He Jian's car was destroyed in the war, in reprisal, he participated in the "encirclement and suppression" led by Chiang Kai-shek and Ho Ying-chin in jiangxi. On November 14, his subordinates executed Yang Kaihui (Mao Zedong's wife) in Changsha.

In 1933, the Nationalist government commissioned him as commander-in-chief of West Route Army.

Second Sino-Japanese War
He was Interior Minister in 1937 and chairman of Military Committee in 1939.

Chinese Civil War
After the Second Sino-Japanese War, he resigned from his post because of illness. He recuperated at Heng Mountain, in Hengyang.

He Jian relocated to British Hong Kong in the Spring of 1949 and one year later he settled down in Taipei, Taiwan. He served as national policy advisor to the President Chiang Kai-shek until his death.

On April 25, 1956, He Jian died of cerebral hemorrhage in Taipei.

Personal life
He had a daughter, He Lian, who was married to Tang Fei-fan, a virologist best known for culturing the Chlamydia trachomatis agent in the yolk sacs of eggs.

References

External links
 
 
 
 

1887 births
1956 deaths
Politicians from Zhuzhou
Baoding Military Academy cadets
National Revolutionary Army generals from Hunan
Republic of China warlords from Hunan
Chinese Civil War refugees
Taiwanese people from Hunan